Artie Machin (1 September 1874 – 30 January 1941) was an Australian rules footballer who played for the South Melbourne Football Club in the Victorian Football League (VFL).

Notes

External links 

1874 births
1941 deaths
VFL/AFL players born outside Australia
Australian rules footballers from Victoria (Australia)
New Zealand players of Australian rules football
New Zealand emigrants to Australia
Sydney Swans players